Harold William Felton (April 1, 1902 – July 12, 1991) was an American writer and folklorist, an author of many children's books and books of American tall tales, among others.

Harold Felton Born in Neola, Iowa. After one year at Creighton University in Omaha, Nebraska, he transferred to the University of Nebraska to earn the Bachelor of Arts degree in 1925 and a law degree in 1928.

After graduation, Felton practiced law in Omaha for 5 years and then worked at the Internal Revenue Service until retirement (1933-1970). On 23 August 1933 he married Hildegard (Helen) Kessler. Later the Felton's moved to Manhattan, New York City.

Books
Bowleg Bill; Seagoing Cowpuncher. Englewood Cliffs, New Jersey, Prentice-Hall, 1957.
(With Edward S. Breck) Cowboy Jamboree: Western Songs and Lore. New York, Knopf, 1951.
 Fire Fightin' Mose.  New York, Knopf, 1955.
Big Mose, Hero Fireman, 1969
John Henry and His Hammer. New York, Knopf, [c1950].
(With Richard Bennett) Legends of Paul Bunyan. New York, A. A. Knopf, 1947.
Lemuel Haynes. Falls Village, CT, Falls Village-Canaan Historical Society, 1989.
Mike Fink, Best of the Keelboatmen. New York, Dodd, Mead, [1960].
True Tall Tales of Stormalong: Sailor of the Seven Seas,1968
New Tall Tales of Pecos Bill. Englewood Cliffs, NJ, Prentice-Hall, [1958].
Pecos Bill, Texas Cowpuncher. New York, Knopf, [c1949].
Pecos Bill and the Mustang, 1965
Uriah Phillips Levy. New York, Dodd, Mead, [c1978].
(With Ed Grant) The World's Most Truthful Man; Tales Told by Ed Grant in Maine. New York, Dodd, Mead, [c1961]. 
Nancy Ward, Cherokee 
Ely S. Parker, spokesman for the Senecas
Canaan: A small New England town during the American Revolutionary War
Gib Morgan, oil driller
James Weldon Johnson
Mumbet: The Story of Elizabeth Freeman
Deborah Sampson: Soldier of the Revolution
Jim Beckwourth, Negro mountain man
Sergeant O'Keefe and his mule Balaam
Edward Rose; Negro trail blazer
William Phips and the treasure Ship
A Horse Named Justin Morgan

References

1902 births
1991 deaths
American folklorists
University of Nebraska–Lincoln alumni
20th-century American writers
20th-century American male writers